Sanjay Kumar Singh may refer to:

Sanjay Kumar Singh (BJP politician) (born 1968), MLA from Lalganj, Bihar (Vidhan Sabha constituency)
Sanjay Kumar Singh (CPI politician), CPI politician from Bihar
Sanjay Kumar Singh (RJD politician) (born 1977), elected to the Bihar Legislative Assembly from Karakaat